Radziejowice is a village in Żyrardów County, Masovian Voivodeship, in east-central Poland. It is the seat of the gmina (administrative district) called Gmina Radziejowice.

References

Radziejowice